The 2015 FIBA Asia Women's Championship was the qualifying tournament for FIBA Asia at the women's basketball tournament at the 2016 Summer Olympics in Rio de Janeiro, Brazil. The tournament was held in Wuhan, China.

The championship was divided into two levels: Level I and Level II. The two lowest finishers of Level I met the top two finishers of Level II to determine which teams qualified for the top Level of the 2017 Championship. The losers were relegated to Level II.

Qualifying 
Semifinalists of the 2013 FIBA Asia Championship for Women:

Qualifying round winners at the 2013 FIBA Asia Championship for Women:

Levels:
Level I include teams that won in the 2013 qualifying round and the semifinalists of the 2013 championship.
Level II are the other teams. Teams that lost in the 2013 qualifying round and the teams that registered first for the championship are in this level.
Host nation's level is dependent on their performance in 2013.

Draw 
Included are the FIBA World Rankings prior to the draw.

Squads

Preliminary round
All times are local (UTC+08:00)

Level I

Level II

Qualifying round
Winners are promoted to Division A of the 2017 FIBA Asia Women's Cup.

Final round
Champions qualify to the 2016 Summer Olympics; runner-up and third place qualify to the 2016 World Qualifying Tournament.

Semifinals

Third place game

Final

Final standing

All-2015 FIBA Asia Women's Team 
PG –  Asami Yoshida
SG –  Shao Ting 
SF –  Kim Dan-bi
PF –  Ramu Tokashiki (Tournament MVP)
C –  Sun Mengran

References 

2013
2015 in women's basketball
women
women
International women's basketball competitions hosted by China
Sport in Wuhan